Night Journey may refer to: 

 Isra and Mi'raj, a Night Journey taken by Muhammad in 621, an event of major importance in Islam
 Night Journey, 1941 spy thriller by Winston Graham 
 Night Journey (film), a 1987 Turkish drama film
 Night Journey (1938 film) directed by Oswald Mitchell
 Night Journeys, 1979 children's book by Avi (Edward Irving Wortis)
 Night Journey (ballet), a Martha Graham ballet
 The Night Journey (novel), a 1981 novel by Kathryn Lasky

See also
 Night Flight (disambiguation)